Bandgorgi (also Romanized as Bandgorgī) is a village in Marz Rural District, Chah Dadkhoda District, Qaleh Ganj County, Kerman Province, Iran. As of the 2006 census, its population was 19, among 4 families.

References 

Populated places in Qaleh Ganj County